The Balochi Standard Alphabet,(Romanized: Balòci Estàndàrdèn Ab) is a writing system used for the Balochi language spoken in Balochistan, a region spanning parts of Pakistan, Afghanistan and Iran. This writing system is derived from the Persian alphabet, itself derived from the Arabic script.

Alphabet
The Balochi alphabet, standardized by Balochi Academy Sarbaz, consists of 32 letters.

Script Correspondence Table

Some diagraphs in Balochi writing
Balochi also have 3 diagraphs set by Balchi Academy sarbaz in Standard Alphabets.

Arabic diacritics in Balochi writing
Arabic diacritics are used in Balochi, as with other scripts derived from Arabic:

Balochi Numbers

Balochi number is look like persian numbers with a little difference

Notes
Some dialects of Balochi very infrequently use the voiced retroflex flap, meaning ڑ. Due to its immense rarity in Balochi, most orthographies of the language leave out glyphs for the phoneme. When written however, it is usually represented with ر.

This alphabet uses two completely separate and new glyphs to represent the long close front unrounded vowel (/iː/). For the initial and medial forms, ݔ is used. This glyph is based on the initial/medial form of the Perso-Arabic "Ye":  (یـ/ـیـ), the difference being the dot above it. Meanwhile for the final form, ے is used, which is also based on ی and is called "Big ye"; it is from Urdu. Sometimes there is خ, meaning /x/.

References

Arabic alphabets
Balochi language
Arabic alphabets for South Asian languages